The Sultanate of Bima (كسلطانن بيما) was a Muslim state in the eastern part of Sumbawa in Indonesia, at the site of the present-day regency of Bima. It was a regionally important polity which formed the eastern limit of Islam in this part of Indonesia and developed an elite culture inspired by Makassarese and Malay models. Bima was subjected to indirect colonial rule from 1669 to 1949 and ceased to be a sultanate in 1958.

History

Origins
From early times, Sumbawa Island was divided in six kingdoms called Sumbawa, Tambora, Dompu, Pekat, Sanggar and Bima. Of these, the last four spoke Nggahi Mbojo, the language of the Bimanese people, related to the languages of Flores and Sumba. The Hindu-Buddhist Bima Kingdom was the forerunner of the Sultanate of Bima and was probably founded around the 11th century. The indigenous name for the kingdom is Mbojo. Local historical legends speak of two brothers, Indera Jambrut and Indera Kemala, who were sons of the mythical hero Bhima and a golden dragon woman and had supernatural powers. They arrived to Sumbawa from the island Satonda and were acknowledged as rulers of the land. There are few historical sources about Bima from the 15th and 16th centuries. At least by the 17th century, the system of government was partly adapted to the system prevailing in the Kingdom of Gowa on Sulawesi. Besides the Sangaji (king) and the Tureli Nggampo (executive regent), the administration of the kingdom included appointed Tureli (ministers), Jeneli (subdistrict chiefs), and Gelarang (village headmen). Shipping and commerce grew rapidly, as attested by the Portuguese Tomé Pires (c. 1515) who says that Bima exported clothes, horses, slaves, and Brazilwood though this is most likely Sappanwood. While Java was the main cultural referent in the beginning, relations with South Sulawesi later became important. Ships and boats increased in number and quality and followed the patterns of navigation and commerce sustained by the Gowa empire.

With increased political integration of the kingdom, the security of the land was enhanced as well. The facilities of the army and navy, and the quality of the weaponry, were updated. An official called the Renda served as commander of the army. The navy was led by an admiral who was called Pabise. Thus, at the end of the 15th century the Kingdom of Bima Mbojo evolved into a crowded commercial center in the eastern archipelago, at the side of Gowa and Ternate. At that time, the Kingdom of Bima Mbojo was a storehouse of rice in the area, similar to Lombok.

The kingdom saw developments in the field of literature, art and culture. Historical tradition asserts that two princes called Mawaa Bilmana and Manggampo Donggo were sent to Gowa in Sulawesi to gather useful knowledge. After some years they returned and used their acquired skills to reform society, planning wet rice fields, improving irrigation systems, and appointing local functionaries. Manggambo Donggo, who subsequently became king, introduced a writing system which had been learned from Gowa. It eventually became the system known as the Mbojo alphabet. Arts and culture of Gowa were studied and developed in the community. In that way Mbojo cultural arts were born, which had a lot of similarities with the arts and culture of Makassar and Bugis.

The territory of the Bima Mbojo kingdom stretched from Satonda in the west to the islands to the east of Sumbawa. According to tradition the dependencies included Manggarai, Ende and Larantuka on Flores, Sumba, Sawu, Alor and Solor. Expansion in the region was conducted by La Mbila and La Ara, the sons of king Bilmana who may have flourished around the mid-16th century. The kingdom of Bima Mbojo continued to flourish until the death of Sangaji Wa'a Ndapa Ma, son of Manggampo Donggo, around the end of the 16th century AD.

Becoming a Sultanate

The kingdom of Makassar conducted a series of military campaigns in all directions in the early 17th century, partly with the aim to spread Islam in the archipelago. Sumbawa was attacked through three expeditions in 1618, 1619, and 1626. One rationale of the invasions was to secure deliveries of rice, which Makassar needed to maintain its expansion policy. According to Bimanese tradition written down in the Bo (an old record of historical events in the Bima Palace), king number XVI (in another count XXI), Mantau Asi Sawo, signed a contract of alliance with Makassar. When he died, power was usurped by the prince Salisi who killed Sawo's son and heir during a hunting party. Sawo's younger son La Kai fled to Teke in the east and allied with the Makassarese. He accepted Islam on 15 Rabiulawal 1030 AH (7 February 1621) and was instructed in the faith by the renowned missionary Dato' ri Bandang. Salisi successfully resisted the Makassarese forces for a while, but was eventually defeated by a fleet from Sulawesi led by the Bimanese grandee La Mbila.

La Kai was installed as king number XXVII, with the title "Ta Ma Bata Wadu Ruma" (He who has a stone grave). According to the Bo this king was married to the sister of the wife of Sultan Alauddin of Makassar named Daeng Sikontu, who was the daughter of Karaeng Kassuarang. The king, hitherto known by the title Sangaji Bima, was entitled "Sultan" of Bima and adopted the Muslim name Sultan Abdul Kahir. A rebellion against his Makassarese-backed rule took place in 1632-33, but was beaten down by troops from Sulawesi. After Sultan Bima I died in 1640 he was succeeded by his son Sirajuddin or Sultan Abu'l-Khair who became Sultan Bima II. He was born in April 1627 (Ramadan 1038 H) and bore the title Uma Teak Ruma. He was also named La Mbila, and the Makassarese called him "I Ambela". He married the sister of Sultan Hasanuddin of Makassar, whose name was Karaeng Bonto Je'ne, on 13 September 1646 (22 Rajab 1066 AH), the wedding taking place in Makassar. Abu'l-Khair Sirajuddin was crowned Sultan Bima II in 1640 (1050 H). He was a person of some ability who assisted Makassar in warfare outside Sumbawa a number of times. Now the influence of Islam was deepened through the efforts of the preacher Dato Maharajalela, who arrived to Bima with six Malay companions. The system of government changed and became based on "Hadat and Islamic Law", in other words a mixture between indigenous customs and religious principles. It was valid until the reign of Sultan Bima XIII (Sultan Ibrahim, 1881-1915). He died on July 22, 1682 (17 Rajab 1099 AH), and was buried in Tolobali.

Abubakar Sultan Nuruddin Ali Syah was the son of Sultan Abu'l-Khair Sirajuddin. He was born on December 5, 1651 (29 Dhul-Hijjah 1061 AH). The Makassarese gave him the title "bung Mappara Din Daeng Matali Karaeng Panaragang". The new sultan ascended the throne in 1682 (Dhul-Hijjah 1093 AH). He was married to Tamemang Daeng, daughter of Raja Tallo Karaeng Langkese, on May 7, 1684 (22 Jumada 1095 H). Thus there was a constant policy of intermarriage with Makassarese princesses, a tradition that was maintained until the mid-18th century, long after the introduction of Dutch suzerainty. After his death, he was entitled "Ma Ruma Wa'a Paju", because he was the first to have a yellow parasol known as "Paju Monca" - parasols were important symbols of kingship in Southeast Asia.

The early-modern Bimanese state has been characterized as remarkably structured for its time. Society was divided into two noble classes called ruma and rato, and a class of free people, dou mardika. Under them was a category of slaves, who were often taken from Manggarai on Flores or Sumba. The population was divided into a large number of task groups called dari, sometimes likened to European guilds since they were defined according their hereditary profession. The king, his vizier (Ruma Bicara), and the royal council, had the ability to reach down to village level and could therefore ensure a relatively stable society.

Dutch overlordship

During the reign of Abu'l-Khair Sirajuddin the Makassar empire was soundly defeated by the Dutch East India Company (VOC) in 1667 and again in 1669. As a consequence the Makassarese formally lost their vast possessions in eastern Indonesia, including their suzerainty over Sumbawa. The Bima Sultanate surrendered to the VOC on 8 December 1669 with an agreement signed in Batavia (Jakarta).

The position of Bima and the other five kingdoms on Sumbawa was initially that of subordinated allies of the VOC. Since Bima was the most important polity on the island, a Dutch posthouder was placed close to the sultan's court. The colonial overlords were keen on securing deliveries of the valuable Sappanwood from the Sumbawan forests, and enforced a monopoly on exports of the wood that lasted until 1874. The Dutch presence was nevertheless marginal, and Bima largely managed its own affairs. Its cultural ties to Sulawesi were not severed, which was shown by marital relations between Bimanese and Makassarese aristocracies. Politically, Bima tried to secure a grip over non-Muslim lands in the region. The sultanate had vague pretensions on Sumba and vied with Makassar over influence in Manggarai on Flores. A Makassarese princess married a Bimanese prince in 1727, and the court of Makassar claimed Manggarai as a sunrang (bridewealth), leading to a long dispute over this area. The sultanate was struck by disaster in 1815 when the Tambora Volcano erupted, causing destruction and severe famine.

The 19th century was otherwise a relatively tranquil period in the history of the sultanate. However, the Dutch colonial state increasingly tried to control local governance. In 1905 Bima was turned into a "fief" (leen) and Sultan Ibrahim had to give up the rights to foreign trade. Also, taxation was reorganized and handled by the colonial authorities. The increasing European encroachment led to a few minor uprisings, especially in Ngali in 1908-09. In 1920 Bima lost control over Manggarai, but the sultan was partly recompensed with Sanggar, a neighbouring kingdom that was merged with Bima in 1928. The Japanese invaded the Dutch East Indies in 1941-42 and the Dutch administration on Sumbawa quickly broke down. The Japanese occupants left the sultans of Bima and (West) Sumbawa in place, and allowed Sultan Muhammad Salahuddin to incorporate another neighbour, the Dompu Sultanate, in his realm. After the proclamation of Indonesian independence in August 1945, the sultan of Bima at first favoured the new republic. However, the Dutch rapidly retook their former positions on Sumbawa and forced Muhammad Salahuddin to hand back Dompu to its own sultan family. Together with large parts of the eastern archipelago, the sultans on the island were pressed to join the new Dutch-created quasi state of East Indonesia in December 1946. This state eventually joined the federal Indonesian republic in 1949 and was dissolved in the following year. Sultan Muhammmad Salahuddin died in Jakarta in 1951. His son Abdul Kahir served as head of the self-ruling territory (kepala daerah swapraja) in 1953-57. In 1958, finally, the Sumbawan principalities were abolished by the Indonesian republic and replaced by a modern bureaucratic structure.

List of rulers

 Indera Jambrut
 Batara Indera Bima (son)
 Batara Sang Luka (son)
 Batara Sang Bima (son)
 Batara Matra Indarwata (son)
 Batara Matra Inderatarati (brother)
 Manggampo Jawa (son)
 Puteri Ratna Lila (sister)
 Maharaja Indera Kumala (brother)
 Batara Indera Luka (son)
 Maharaja Bima Indera Seri (son)
 Mawaä Paju Longge (son)
 Mawaä Indera Mbojo (brother)
 Mawaä Bilmana (brother)
 Manggampo Donggo (brother)
 Mambora ba Pili Tuta (son)
 Tureli Nggampo (son of Mawaä Bilmana)
 Mawaä Ndapa (son of Manggampo Donggo)
 Ruma Samara (son)
 Ruma Sarise (brother)
 Ruma Mantau Asi Sawo (brother)
 Ruma Manuru Sarei (brother)
 Tureli Nggampo
 Mambora di Sapega (son of Mambora ba Pili Tuta)
 Mantau Asi Peka (son of Mawaä Ndapa)
 Abdul Kahir (son of Ruma Mantau Asi Sawo) c. 1620-1640
 Ambela Abu'l-Khair Sirajuddin (son) 1640-1682
 Nuruddin Abubakar Ali Syah (son) 1682-1687
 Jamaluddin Ali Syah (son) 1687-1696
 Hasanuddin Muhammad Ali Syah (son) 1697-1731
 Alauddin Muhammad Syah (son) 1731-1748
 Kamalat Syah (daughter) 1748-1751
 Abdul Kadim Muhammad Syah (brother) 1751-1773
 Abdul Hamid Muhammad Syah (son) 1773-1817
 Ismail Muhammad Syah (son) 1817-1854
 Abdullah (son) 1854-1868
 Abdul Aziz (son) 1868-1881
 Ibrahim (brother) 1881-1915
 Muhammad Salahuddin (son) 1915-1951
 Abdul Kahir (son) territorial head 1954-1957

References
Notes

Citations

Precolonial states of Indonesia
Islamic states in Indonesia
17th century in Indonesia
West Nusa Tenggara